Mussoorie International School (MIS) is an all-girls residential school in Mussoorie, Uttarakhand, India.

Established in 1984, MIS is affiliated with the Council for the Indian School Certificate Examinations (CISCE code UT026), New Delhi and University of Cambridge International Examinations (CIE) and IBDP.

The school is located in a  campus in the hills of Mussoorie. MIS students are divided into three houses: Laxmi (orange), Santoshi (yellow), and Gayatri (blue)

Mussoorie International School is an all-girls boarding school in Mussoorie. It is affiliated with the Council for the Indian School Certificate Examinations (CISCE), International Baccalaureate (IB), and Cambridge Assessment International Education (CAIE). The school is located in the pristine hills of Mussoorie and is 33 km from Dehradun city. It offers education to girls from grades 1 to 12.

History

Mussoorie International School was established in 1984 as an all-girls boarding school in Mussoorie. Gurudev Pandit Shri Ram Acharyaji founded it. Gurudev Pandit Shri Ram Sharma Acharyaji was an eminent philosopher, a social reformer, a visionary of the New Golden Era, and the founder of All World Gayatri Pariwar, headquartered in Haridwar, India.

Vision

Mussoorie International School believes in GAYATRI MANTRA. It aims to instill in every child the ability of patience, acceptance, affection, and respect for oneself and others. The vision is to offer a platform for every girl child to explore her hidden talent in the desired field.

Infrastructure

The Mussoorie International School campus is spread over 40 acres in Mussoorie. The school possesses a state-of-art infrastructure to provide students with the best experience and opportunities to flourish and develop into proficient individuals. The school is a boarding school whose infrastructure includes Dormitory, Kitchen and Dining, Library, Laboratories, Medical Centre, Recreational Area, Indoor and Outdoor Stadium, Gymnasium, Playgrounds, Swimming Pool, etc.

References:

https://thehillsofmussoorie.com/uttarakhand/mussoorie-international-school-celebrates-39th-founders-with-full-fervor-and-zeal/

https://www.linkedin.com/company/mussoorie-international-school/

https://www.edustoke.com/residential/mussoorie/mussoorie-international-school-charleville-srinagar

https://eduminatti.com/schools/dehradun/mussoorie-international-school-mussoorie

https://www.schoolmykids.com/school/mussoorie-international-school-mussoorie-dehradun-uttarakhand-india-s10011307

https://www.euttaranchal.com/schools/mussoorie-international-school-mussoorie.php

https://eduminatti.com/schools/dehradun/mussoorie-international-school-mussoorie

https://truemaths.com/mussoorie-international-school-admission-fees-alumni/

http://www.99uttarakhand.in/mussoorie-international-school-mussoorie.php

https://school.careers360.com/schools/mussoorie-international-school-mussoorie-dehradun

External Link:

https://www.misindia.net/
Cambridge schools in India
Primary schools in India
High schools and secondary schools in Uttarakhand
Boarding schools in Uttarakhand
Girls' schools in Uttarakhand
Education in Dehradun district
Mussoorie
Educational institutions established in 1984
1984 establishments in Uttar Pradesh
Girls boarding schools